Yengalyshevo (Yenğalış) is a rural locality (a selo) and the administrative centre of Yengalyshevsky Selsoviet, Chishminsky District, Bashkortostan, Russia. The population was 485 as of 2010. There are 26 streets.

Geography 
Yengalyshevo is located 38 km southeast of Chishmy (the district's administrative centre) by road. Fomichevo is the nearest rural locality.

References 

Rural localities in Chishminsky District